Vulgichneumon brevicinctor is a species of ichneumon wasp in the family Ichneumonidae. One of the most common species of the subfamily Ichneumoninae in North America. Found in most of the US and Canada.

References

Further reading

External links

 

Ichneumoninae
Insects described in 1825